Return to Zero is the seventh album by the Swedish stoner rock band Spiritual Beggars. It was released in Europe on 30 August 2010. It is their first album to feature Apollo Papathanasio of Firewind on vocals.

Formats included a single CD digipak and a single disc jewel case version. Vinyl was available in two colors, purple and black.

Track listing
All songs written by Michael Amott, except for where noted.
 "Return to Zero (Intro)" (Per Wiberg) – 0:52
 "Lost in Yesterday" – 4:49
 "Star Born" (Amott, Wiberg, Ludwig Witt) – 3:06
 "The Chaos of Rebirth" (Amott, Angela Gossow)– 5:21
 "We Are Free" – 3:24
 "Spirit of the Wind" – 5:52
 "Coming Home" – 3:26
 "Concrete Horizon" – 6:02
 "A New Dawn Rising" – 4:42
 "Believe in Me" – 6:41
 "Dead Weight" (Wiberg) – 4:51
 "The Road Less Travelled" – 3:45
 "Time to Live" – 4:15 (Uriah Heep cover)

Personnel 
Michael Amott – guitars, mandolin, guitar effects, producer
Ludwig Witt – drums, percussion
Per Wiberg – keyboards
Sharlee D'Angelo – bass
Apollo Papathanasio – vocals

2010 albums
Spiritual Beggars albums
Inside Out Music albums